Strepsicrates penechra is a moth of the  family Tortricidae.

It is known from Madagascar and La Réunion.

The wingspan of this species is 14 mm.

References

ğ

Moths described in 1989
Eucosmini